Pulvermuhl is a quarter in eastern Luxembourg City, in southern Luxembourg.

, the quarter has a population of 391 inhabitants.

References

Quarters of Luxembourg City